West of Mojave is a 1925 American silent Western film directed by Harry L. Fraser and starring Gordon Clifford, Charlotte Pierce and Frank Lackteen.

Cast
 Gordon Clifford
 Charlotte Pierce 
 Frank Lackteen 
 James McElhern
 Dorothea Wolbert

References

Bibliography
 Langman, Larry. A Guide to Silent Westerns. Greenwood Publishing Group, 1992.

External links
 

1925 films
1925 Western (genre) films
1920s English-language films
American black-and-white films
Films directed by Harry L. Fraser
Silent American Western (genre) films
1920s American films